Milies is a village in the municipal unit of Istiaia on Euboea island, Greece. Its population in 2011 was 169. It was an independent community until 1997 when it became a part of the municipality of Istiaia.

Population

History
The modern village resulted from the merger of two previous settlements, Palaiovrysi (Παλαιόβρυση) and Karytsa (Καρύτσα), around the time of the Fall of Constantinople in 1453. Local tradition has it that some inhabitants later left to escape pirate attacks, and founded the village of Milies on Mount Pelion. Archaeological excavations in the nearby Lavrentis hill have shown the site to have been inhabited since Antiquity, with remains from the Classical and the Hellenistic periods discovered.

External links
 Milies on GTP Travel Pages

See also

List of settlements in the Euboea regional unit

References

Populated places in Euboea